I'm Not Afraid or variations on that phrase may refer to:
I'm Not Afraid, a 2017 album by John Mark Nelson
"I'm Not Afraid" (Black song), a song from the 1987 album Wonderful Life
"I'm Not Afraid", a song by Remy Zero from the 2001 album The Golden Hum
"I'm Not Afraid", a song by Lacuna Coil from the 2009 album Shallow Life
"Not Afraid", a song by Eminem from the 2010 album Recovery